Moritzia is a genus of flowering plants belonging to the family Boraginaceae.

Its native range is Costa Rica to Southern Tropical America. It is found in Brazil, Colombia, Costa Rica, Ecuador, Panamá, Peru and Venezuela.
 
The genus name of Moritzia is in honour of Alexander Moritzi (1806–1850), a Swiss naturalist and early proponent of evolution. 
It was first described and published in Pl. Vasc. Gen. Vol.1 on page 280 in 1840.

Species
According to Kew:
Moritzia ciliata 
Moritzia dusenii 
Moritzia lindenii

References

Boraginoideae
Boraginaceae genera
Plants described in 1840
Flora of Brazil
Flora of Venezuela
Flora of western South America